This article is about the particular significance of the year 1817 to Wales and its people.

Incumbents
Lord Lieutenant of Anglesey – Henry Paget, 1st Marquess of Anglesey 
Lord Lieutenant of Brecknockshire and Monmouthshire – Henry Somerset, 6th Duke of Beaufort
Lord Lieutenant of Caernarvonshire – Thomas Bulkeley, 7th Viscount Bulkeley
Lord Lieutenant of Cardiganshire – William Edward Powell (from 22 November)
Lord Lieutenant of Carmarthenshire – George Rice, 3rd Baron Dynevor 
Lord Lieutenant of Denbighshire – Sir Watkin Williams-Wynn, 5th Baronet    
Lord Lieutenant of Flintshire – Robert Grosvenor, 1st Marquess of Westminster 
Lord Lieutenant of Glamorgan – John Crichton-Stuart, 2nd Marquess of Bute 
Lord Lieutenant of Merionethshire – Sir Watkin Williams-Wynn, 5th Baronet
Lord Lieutenant of Montgomeryshire – Edward Clive, 1st Earl of Powis
Lord Lieutenant of Pembrokeshire – Richard Philipps, 1st Baron Milford
Lord Lieutenant of Radnorshire – George Rodney, 3rd Baron Rodney

Bishop of Bangor – Henry Majendie 
Bishop of Llandaff – Herbert Marsh
Bishop of St Asaph – John Luxmoore 
Bishop of St Davids – Thomas Burgess

Events
March - A riot breaks out in Amlwch over food prices, and a ship carrying flour is prevented from leaving the harbour.
22 July - Windham Sadler succeeds in crossing the Irish Sea by hot air balloon, landing near Holyhead.
October John Gibson arrives in Rome to study sculpture with help from Antonio Canova.
6 December - Joseph Tregelles Price advertises Neath Abbey ironworks for sale.
dates unknown  
Lewis Weston Dillwyn retires from managing the Cambrian Pottery at Swansea.
Joseph Harris (Gomer) launches the unsuccessful periodical, Greal y Bedyddwyr.
Sir Thomas Frankland Lewis drafts the report on the Poor Law which brings its abuses to the attention of the public.
Construction work commences on the first chapel in Tywyn.
Approximate date - Britain's longest tramroad tunnel is opened at Pwll du near Blaenavon. The Pwll Du Tunnel is more than a mile (2400 m) in length. Begun as a mineral adit, at this time it carries a horse-drawn double track plateway of approximately 2 ft (600 mm) gauge carrying material for Blaenavon Ironworks; next summer it will be incorporated in Thomas Hill's Tramroad, connecting to the Monmouthshire and Brecon Canal.

Arts and literature

New books
Catherine Hutton - The Welsh Mountaineer
John Thomas (Eos Gwynedd) -

Music
14 July - Robert Williams composes the famous hymn-tune Llanfair (formerly named Bethel).

Births
3 March - Robert Thompson Crawshay, iron-master (died 1879)
6 May - John Prichard, architect (d. 1886)
June - John Corbett, industrialist (died 1901)
16 June - Charles Herbert James, politician (died 1890)
16 August - Rowland Williams, theologian and academic (died 1870)
17 September - Hugh Humphreys, publisher (died 1896)
13 November - Henry Brinley Richards, composer (died 1885)
17 December - Erasmus Jones, novelist (died 1909)
Thomas Thomas, chapel architect and minister (died 1888)

Deaths
16 January - General Vaughan Lloyd, commander of the Woolwich Arsenal, 80
27 March - Josiah Boydell, artist, 65
17 July - William Williams (antiquary), author, 79
31 July - Benjamin Hall, industrialist, 36
date unknown - David Hughes, Principal of Jesus College, Oxford

References

 
Wales